Bokora Corridor Wildlife Reserve is a conservation protected area in northeastern Uganda.

See also
 Lorengecora

References